Arianna Sessi (born 8 October 1999) is an Italian professional racing cyclist, who most recently rode for UCI Women's Continental Team . In August 2020, she rode in the 2020 Strade Bianche Women's race in Italy.

References

External links

1999 births
Living people
Italian female cyclists
Place of birth missing (living people)